Adela albicinctella is a moth of the family Adelidae. It is found in France, Germany, Switzerland, Austria, Italy, Slovakia and Poland.

It is a montane species feeding first on the flowers of Salix glaucosericea then in the leaf litter.

References

External links

Lepiforum.de

Moths described in 1852
Moths of Europe
Adelidae
Taxa named by Josef Johann Mann